Moitrelia hispanella is a species of snout moth. It is found in Spain, Portugal, France and North Africa, including Morocco.

The wingspan is 18–22 mm.

References

Moths described in 1859
Phycitini
Moths of Europe